Feldmark, also spelt fjaeldmark, is a plant community characteristic of sites where plant growth is severely restricted by extremes of cold and exposure to wind, typical of alpine tundra and subantarctic environments.

Description

Distribution
Feldmark occurs in the least favourable situations for plant growth, including late-lying snowdrift areas on leeward slopes and cold, highly wind-exposed ridges. Because feldmark species are adapted to cold bare ground, some are able to colonise areas of severe erosion where the topsoil has been removed, leaving only a surface of broken rock or stones.  In areas with strong prevailing winds, expansion through layering on the sheltered sides of plants means that they may grow preferentially on the protected sides and gradually move downwind across the landscape.

See also
 Fellfield
 Boników (formerly called Feldmark), Ostrów Wielkopolski County, in western Poland

Notes

References
 
 

Habitats
Tundra
Alpine flora
Flora of the Antarctic
Habitat